Andrei Yakovlevich Kalina (born 21 July 1987) is a Ukraine-born Russian Paralympic swimmer who represented Ukraine from 2002 to 2013 and Russia since 2015.

Biography

Early life
Kalina was born 21 July 1987 in Slavyansk (Sloviansk), Soviet Union, with a missing left lower arm. In 2000, he started swimming in the Donetsk-based sports center Invasport. However, he almost decided to retire from sports after he did not find good conditions even in Kyiv. So, he started search them outside of Ukraine, eventually deciding to emigrate to Russia. After finding better practice and living conditions in Russia, Kalina decided to represent Russia internationally in 2015.
During Russian-Ukrainian War silently supported aggression against his home country.

Career
Competing for Ukraine, Kalina won numerous titles, including the Paralympic Games three times in a row. Kalina won his fourth consecutive title in 100 m breaststroke at the 2020 Summer Paralympics, now representing the Russian Paralympic Committee.

References

1987 births
Living people
Medalists at the World Para Swimming Championships
Paralympic swimmers of Russia
Paralympic swimmers of Ukraine
Paralympic gold medalists for the Russian Paralympic Committee athletes
Paralympic gold medalists for Ukraine
Paralympic silver medalists for Ukraine
Paralympic bronze medalists for Ukraine
Paralympic medalists in swimming
Medalists at the 2004 Summer Paralympics
Medalists at the 2008 Summer Paralympics
Medalists at the 2012 Summer Paralympics
Medalists at the 2020 Summer Paralympics
Swimmers at the 2004 Summer Paralympics
Swimmers at the 2008 Summer Paralympics
Swimmers at the 2012 Summer Paralympics
Swimmers at the 2020 Summer Paralympics
People from Sloviansk
S9-classified Paralympic swimmers
Sportspeople from Donetsk Oblast